Genevieve Juliette Guenther is an American author and climate change activist. A former Renaissance scholar, she is the founding director of the media watchdog organization End Climate Silence.  She is currently affiliate faculty at the Tishman Environment and Design Center at The New School.
Her upcoming book, The Language of Climate Politics, is forthcoming from Oxford University Press.

Early life and education 
Guenther received her bachelor's degree from Columbia University and her  Ph.D. from the University of California, Berkeley, in 2004, in Renaissance literature.

Career

Literature 

Guenther started her career as a tenure-track English professor at the University of Rochester. Her book, "Magical Imaginations," analyzed works by Spenser, Marlowe, and Shakespeare.

Climate-Related Work

Guenther has written articles about the language of climate change, media coverage of climate change, and the cultural aspects of the climate crisis (see Bibliography below for examples).

In 2018 she founded the volunteer organization End Climate Silence, which advocates for increased coverage of climate change in news media, and has been cited as an "incredibly effective advocate for persuading journalists to include the climate emergency in their stories."

Her work has been noted for her criticism of fossil fuel funding for university research, as well as her criticism of discussions (such as What If We Stopped Pretending?) that frame climate change as an "apocalypse" that "we can't prevent".

Guenther has been noted for praising the movie Don't Look Up as being useful in raising "awareness about the terrifying urgency of the climate crisis", and for noting that technologies are available, at least in, "research, development, and demonstration" phases, for decarbonizing the economy, "with the right policies." Guenther was an Expert Reviewer of the IPCC Sixth Assessment Report.

Her upcoming book, The Language of Climate Politics, is forthcoming from Oxford University Press.

Media appearances

Guenther has been interviewed by a number of media outlets. In 2018 she appeared on the CNN show Reliable Sources. In 2019 she was interviewed by Brian  Lehrer on "The Brian Lehrer Show," on WNYC public radio.  In October 2020 her work was profiled in The New Yorker. In 2021 Guenther was interviewed on a climate-focused episode of The New York Times podcast, "The Argument."

Bibliography

Books 

 Magical Imaginations: Instrumental Aesthetics in the English Renaissance (2012)

Selected Essays

References

External links 
 Official website
 EndClimateSilence.org

Living people
21st-century American writers
American women essayists
21st-century American non-fiction writers
American climate activists
climate communication
Columbia University alumni
University of California, Berkeley alumni
Year of birth missing (living people)
The New School faculty